Ambrish Kumar was an Indian politician from Uttarakhand and former MLA of the Uttarakhand Legislative Assembly from Haridwar assembly constituency. He was a member of the Indian National Congress. He had contested 2019 Indian general election as a candidate of Indian National Congress from Haridwar Lok Sabha constituency and lost the election to Former Union Minister Ramesh Pokhriyal.

Elections contested

References

External links
 2017 Assembly Election
 2009 Loksabha Election
 2007 Assembly Election

Living people
20th-century Indian politicians
Indian National Congress politicians from Uttarakhand
Uttarakhand politicians
Year of birth missing (living people)
Samajwadi Party politicians